Wressle railway station is a railway station on the Selby Line that serves the village of Wressle in the East Riding of Yorkshire, England.

History
The Hull and Selby Railway was opened 2 July 1840. Wressle station does not appear to have been an original feature of the line; however a market day service from "Wressel Bridge" was recorded in 1843.

The station was in full use by 1855. The station was a single storey brick structure with a verandah, located on the south platform. The spellings Wressel and Wressle have both been used, with the 'Wressle' becoming standard after around 1863.

Wressle was listed for closure in the 1963 Beeching report, but remained open to avoid local hardship. The station became unstaffed in 1976.

Facilities
The station has very basic amenities - it has a waiting shelter on platform 1, a single customer help point on platform 2 and timetable poster boards on each side.  There is no ticket machine, so passengers must buy in advance or on the train.  Step-free access is available to both platforms via the level crossing at the eastern end.

Services
Two of the Hull trains continue to Bridlington via Beverley since the December 2019 Timetable Change. No trains call on Sundays. A normal Monday to Friday service operates on Bank holidays.

The station, and all trains serving it, are operated by Northern.

Notes

References

Sources

External links 

Railway stations in the East Riding of Yorkshire
DfT Category F2 stations
Northern franchise railway stations
Former Hull and Selby Railway stations
Railway stations in Great Britain opened in 1840